Millstream is a rural locality in the Tablelands Region, Queensland, Australia. In the  Millstream had a population of 1,246 people.

Geography 
Millstream is bounded to the west by the Wild River, while The Millstream flows from east to south-west through the locality. Their confluence which creates the Herbert River is just to the south-west of the locality in neighbouring Innot Hot Springs.

Smaller farm blocks are found in the southern part of the locality, just to the north of The Millstream, where the land is flatter (about 730 metres above sea level). However, much of the locality is mountainous, rising to unnamed peaks of about 1000 metres above sea level); this area is not developed. The northern part of the locality forms part of The Bluff State Forest. Millstream Falls and the associated Millstream Falls National Park are not in the locality but immediately adjacent in neighbouring Koombooloomba.

The Kennedy Highway passes through the locality from east to west.

History 
In the  Millstream had a population of 1,246 people.

References 

Tablelands Region
Localities in Queensland